Abyssochrysos melanioides is a species of sea snail, a marine gastropod mollusk in the family Abyssochrysidae.

This is the type specimen for which Tomlin created a new family Abyssochrisidae, but couldn't refer at the time to any superfamily. Some years later he thought it had any affinities with the families Littorinidae Children, 1834 and Thiaridae Gill, 1871 (1823). Houbrick (1979) brought the then known species of Abyssochrysos in the superfamily Loxonematacea Koken, with close affinities to the families Zygopleuridae Wenz, 1939, Paleozygopleuridae Horny, and Pseudozygopleuridae Knight, 1930.

Distribution
 The type specimen was dredged from a depth of 1645 m to 1828 m off the Cape of Good Hope, South Africa.
 Philippines
 Indonesia

Description

References

External links

melanioides
Gastropods described in 1927